Michel Piraux (born 15 October 1955) is a former Belgian professional football referee. He was a full international for FIFA from 1991 until 2001. He refereed the 2000 Belgian Cup Final between Genk and Standard Liège.

References 

1955 births
Living people
Belgian football referees